Luca Pellegrini (born 31 March 1964 in Amelia) is an Italian former swimmer who competed in the 1988 Summer Olympics.

References

1964 births
Living people
Italian male swimmers
Italian male freestyle swimmers
Olympic swimmers of Italy
Swimmers at the 1988 Summer Olympics
Mediterranean Games gold medalists for Italy
Mediterranean Games medalists in swimming
Swimmers at the 1987 Mediterranean Games
Sportspeople from the Province of Terni
20th-century Italian people